Jessica Shaia "Jessi" Cruickshank (born July 17, 1983) is a Canadian television personality. She is the former co-host of MTV Canada's program The After Show and its various incarnations including The Hills: The After Show and The City: Live After Show with co-host Dan Levy. She also hosted Canada's Smartest Person and The Goods on CBC.

Early life
Cruickshank was born in Calgary, Alberta, but grew up in Vancouver, British Columbia. Her mother is Joyce Resin who once hosted a CBC show called Alive: The Picture of Health. She has an older sister named Amanda Grace, who works as a reporter and anchor for KING-TV in Seattle. Cruickshank was part of a school's all-male improv comedy group alongside actor Seth Rogen right before becoming a television personality, putting her comedic skills in use while reporting or interviewing celebrities. She also graduated from University of Toronto with a degree in English and Drama.

Career
Cruickshank's first acting role was in a Christmas commercial for Shoppers Drug Mart. In her pre-teen years, she had a small role in the made-for-television movie called For Hope which was directed by Bob Saget in 1996. Before joining MTV, Cruickshank was a co-host on YTV for a show called Weird On Wheels along with Mackay Taggart.

Days on MTV
Previously, Cruickshank was one of the original seven co-hosts of MTV's flagship series MTV Live, which is now hosted by fellow MTV hosts Daryn Jones, Nicole Holness and Paul "The Intern" Lemieux.

Interviews with celebrities
Cruickshank has interviewed an array of high-profile people from the pop culture spectrum including the cast of The Hills, The City and the movie Twilight, along with Adam Lambert, Taylor Lautner, Backstreet Boys, Ryan Reynolds, Bill Gates, Zac Efron, Jamie Foxx, Whitney Port, Lauren Conrad and Bradley Cooper.

Other work
Cruickshank is now living in Los Angeles, where she filmed a show called Hollywood Survival Guide, which aired on MTV. In Los Angeles, Cruickshank was a producer at The Oprah Winfrey Network. Cruickshank was the Los Angeles correspondent for the Canadian entertainment show etalk, she also has joined the etalk TIFF coverage team for the past few years. Cruickshank also co-hosted The CW show Oh Sit!, which aired on MuchMusic in Canada.She was a co host on the CBC show The Goods. She also hosted the reunion special of the reality TV show Jerseylicious.

Philanthropy
She is still actively involved with the organization Free The Children, where she has filmed multiple MTV specials. She is currently an ambassador for them speaking and hosting multiple We Days and Free The Children events. Cruickshank is also a public speaker, where she can regularly be found all across the country speaking on her experiences, while inspiring others to be the best versions of themselves.

Filmography
Cruickshank played Kristin in The Rest of My Life, a TV movie concluding the ninth season of Degrassi: The Next Generation that aired in Canada on MuchMusic on  July 16, 2010, and in the United States on TeenNick. She was also in the direct-to-video movie Virtuality that came out in 2010.

See also
 The After Show
 Canada's Smartest Person http://www.cbc.ca/smartestperson/hosts/

References

Living people
Actresses from Calgary
University of Toronto alumni
Canadian child actresses
Canadian television talk show hosts
1981 births